West Berkshire Council is the local authority for West Berkshire, a unitary authority in Berkshire, England. Until 1 April 1998 it was a non-metropolitan district.

Political control
Since the first election to the council in 1973 political control of the council has been held by the following parties:

Non-metropolitan district

Unitary authority

Leadership
The leaders of the council since 2003 have been:

Council elections

Non-metropolitan district elections
1973 Newbury District Council election
1976 Newbury District Council election
1979 Newbury District Council election
1983 Newbury District Council election (New ward boundaries)
1987 Newbury District Council election
1991 Newbury District Council election (District boundary changes took place but the number of seats remained the same)
1995 Newbury District Council election

Unitary authority elections
1997 West Berkshire Council election

By-elections

"

"

District result maps

References

External links
West Berkshire Council

 
Council elections in Berkshire
Unitary authority elections in England